Erbessa sobria is a moth of the family Notodontidae first described by Francis Walker in 1854. It is found in Brazil, Ecuador, Colombia, Venezuela and Guyana.

The larvae feed on Miconia species.

References

Moths described in 1854
Notodontidae of South America